The canton of Mont-de-Marsan-1 is an administrative division of the Landes department, southwestern France. It was created at the French canton reorganisation which came into effect in March 2015. Its seat is in Mont-de-Marsan.

It consists of the following communes:
 
Bostens
Campet-et-Lamolère
Gaillères
Geloux
Lucbardez-et-Bargues
Mont-de-Marsan (partly)
Pouydesseaux
Saint-Avit
Saint-Martin-d'Oney
Uchacq-et-Parentis

References

Cantons of Landes (department)